Franz Eichhorst (Berlin 7 September 1885 – 30 April 1948 Innsbruck) was a German painter, engraver and illustrator, one of a number of German artists known for his war paintings supporting the Nazi regime.

Eichhorst volunteered for military service for Germany in World War I.  In the early 1920s, Eichhorst set up a summer studio in Matrei in Osttirol. There in 1928, he created one of his most well-known works, Mädchen mit Krug (Girl with Pitcher).

In 1938 he created a series of war and Nazi propaganda murals representing the last 25 years of German history for the Schöneberg city hall in Berlin; these were repainted and deleted at the end of World War II in May 1945. In April 1938, Adolf Hitler bestowed upon him the honorary title of Professor.  Over 50 of his paintings were displayed at the Great German art exhibition (Große Deutsche Kunstausstellung) at the Haus der Kunst in Munich, including battle scenes from the Second World War, particularly those from the conflicts with Poland and Russia.

See also

 List of German painters

Bibliography 
 Julius Redzinski, Erinnerung an Stalingrad. Franz Eichhorst as a War Artist in the Nazi Era, in: Meike Hoffmann, Dieter Scholz (ed.), Unmastered Past? Modernism in Nazi Germany. Art, Art Trade, Curatorial Practice, Verbrecher Verlag, Berlin 2020, ISBN 978-3-95732-453-5, p. 112–131.
 Hans Rosenhagen, Franz Eichhorst, in: Velhagen & Klasings Monatshefte, Vol. 35, No. 12 (1921), p. 545–560.

References

External links
 Nazi War Art 1940-44. Small gallery includes three Eichhorst paintings.

20th-century German painters
20th-century German male artists
German male painters
German muralists
1885 births
1948 deaths
German war artists
Nazi propagandists
World War II artists